The 1991 WFA Cup Final was the 21st final of the WFA Cup, England's primary cup competition for women's football teams. The showpiece event was played under the auspices of the Women's Football Association (WFA).

Match

Millwall won the game 1–0 with a goal by Yvonne Baldeo.

Summary

Broadcast

The final was broadcast on Channel 4.

References

External links
 
 Report at WomensFACup.co.uk

FA
Women's FA Cup finals
Doncaster Rovers Belles L.F.C. matches 
May 1991 sports events in the United Kingdom